The 1986 Pacific hurricane season featured several tropical cyclones that contributed to significant flooding to the Central United States. The hurricane season officially started May 15, 1986, in the eastern Pacific, and June 1, 1986 in the central Pacific, and lasted until November 30, 1986 in both regions. These dates conventionally delimit the period of each year when most tropical cyclones form in the northeastern Pacific Ocean. A total of 17 named storms and 9 hurricanes developed during the season; this is slightly above the averages of 15 named storms and 8 hurricanes, respectively. In addition, 26 tropical depressions formed in the eastern Pacific during 1986, which, at the time, was the second most ever recorded; only the 1982 Pacific hurricane season saw a higher total.

Several storms throughout the season affected land. Hurricane Estelle passed south of Hawaii, resulting in $2 million in damage and two deaths. Hurricanes Newton, Paine and Roslyn each struck Northwestern Mexico. While damage was minimal from these three systems near their location of landfall, Paine brought considerable flooding to the Great Plains. The overall flooding event resulted in $350 million in damage, with the worst effects being recorded in Oklahoma.

Seasonal summary 

Activity in the Eastern Pacific Hurricane Center's (EPHC) area of responsibility was above average. There were 25 tropical depressions, one short of the record set in 1982, which had 26. Only one storm formed in the Central Pacific Hurricane Center's (CPHC) area of responsibility, Tropical Depression One-C. Six other cyclones entered the CPHC area of responsibility from the EPHC area of responsibility. In all, 17 systems formed, which is two storms above normal. In addition, 9 hurricanes were reported during the season, one more than average. An average number (3) of major hurricanes – Category 3 or higher on the Saffir-Simpson hurricane wind scale – was also reported.

The season began with the formation of Hurricane Agatha on May 22 and ended with the dissipation of Tropical Depression Twenty Five on October 25, spanning 147 days. Although it was nearly two weeks shorter than the 1985 Pacific hurricane season, the season was six days longer than average. The EPHC issued 406 tropical cyclone advisories, which were issued four times a day at 0000, 0600, 1200, and 1800 UTC. In 1986, hurricane hunters flew into three storms; Newton, Roslyn, and Estelle. In Newton, the National Oceanic and Atmospheric Administration (NOAA) conducted environmental research in the cyclone. In addition, the National Weather Service Field Service Station provided the East Pacific with excellent satellite coverage.

During the months of May and June, four named systems developed. In July, one tropical storm and two hurricanes formed. The following month, five tropical systems developed. Towards the end of the season, tropical cyclone activity declined somewhat. While five storms formed in September, only one formed in October and none during the month of November. A moderate El Niño was present throughout the season; water temperatures across the equatorial Central Pacific were 1.3 °C (3 °F) above normal. In addition, the Pacific Decadal Oscillation (PDO) was in a warm phase during this time period.

Three tropical cyclones made landfall in 1986. The first, Hurricane Newton made landfall near Cabo San Lucas, bringing minor damage. Another storm, Hurricane Paine brushed Cabo San Lucas, and later moved inland over Sonora. Paine caused minimal impacts at landfall, but its remnants were described as one of the worst floods in Oklahoma history. Flooding affected 52 counties in Oklahoma, which resulted in a total of $350 million in damage. The final storm to make landfall during the hurricane season was Hurricane Roslyn. The hurricane produced some flooding, but no serious damage. In addition, Hurricane Estelle came close enough to Hawaii to require a hurricane watch. Two drownings were reported, and the total damage was around $2 million.

Systems

Hurricane Agatha 

The 1986 Pacific hurricane season's first tropical disturbance formed  from the tip of Baja California Sur on May 20. By 0000 UTC May 22, the circulation began to tighten and become more organized, and thus the EPHC upgraded the disturbance into Tropical Depression One-E that morning. Approximately 48 hours after becoming a tropical depression, the system was upgraded into Tropical Storm Agatha, the first storm of the season. After moving southeast, the cyclone made an abrupt change in direction, turning towards the north. Agatha strengthened into a hurricane on May 25 near the coast of Mexico, reaching its peak intensity of 75 mph (115 km/h). Turning southeast, the system quickly weakened into a tropical depression, but regained tropical storm strength on May 28, only to dissipate that day.

Tropical Depression Two 

A tropical disturbance formed on May 30 in the eastern Gulf of Tehuantepec. The disturbance was moving very slowly when it was upgraded to Tropical Depression Two-E on May 31. The depression began to weaken six hours later and the final advisory by the EPHC was released on June 1. Most of Mexico received rainfall, with over  falling on Yucatán Peninsula.

Tropical Storm Blas 

A tropical disturbance originated from the Intertropical Convergence Zone (ITCZ) on June 16. The depression intensified into Tropical Storm Blas the next day. It kept that strength for only six hours, weakening into a depression again as it moved into cooler waters.

Hurricane Celia 

On June 24, five days after Tropical Storm Blas dissipated, a tropical disturbance developed south of the Gulf of Tehuantepec. Later that day, its circulation had become well-defined enough for the EPHC to upgrade the disturbance into Tropical Depression Four. Winds reached 40 mph (65 km/h), enough to upgrade the system into Tropical Storm Celia on June 26. While located off the coast of Mexico, Celia strengthened into a hurricane at 1800 UTC June 27. An eye became evident on satellite imagery and the hurricane reached its peak intensity of 90 mph (145 km/h) on June 28 at 1600 UTC as it tracked near Socorro Island. Meanwhile, Celia moved into much cooler water, which resulted in rapid weakening. On June 30, Celia was downgraded into a tropical depression. The EPHC released its final advisory at 1800 UTC that day as the system had dissipated.

Tropical Storm Darby 

The fifth tropical cyclone of the season originated from a tropical disturbance that was first noticed on July 2. The disturbance was upgraded into Tropical Depression Five at 1800 UTC July 3. Turning west-northwest, the depression strengthened into Tropical Storm Darby on July 5. Darby peaked at 40 mph (65 km/h), and after turning northwest, encountered  waters. The storm began to weaken as thunderstorm activity became displaced from the center and spread northward over Arizona and California on July 6. The cyclone dissipated on July 7.

Hurricane Estelle 

During the afternoon of July 16, a tropical depression formed thousands of miles west of Mexico, and within 12 hours it strengthened into a tropical storm. On July 18, Estelle intensified into a hurricane. Located in a favorable environment, Estelle continued strengthening to become the first major hurricane of the season on July 20. The hurricane entered the Central Pacific Hurricane Center's area of responsibility near its peak strength of 130 mph (215 km/h), a Category 4 hurricane. The hurricane veered to the west and passed south of Hawaii. Estelle weakened to a tropical storm on July 23, and on July 25, it weakened to a depression. The storm dissipated two days later.

In advance of Hurricane Estelle, the National Weather Service issued a hurricane watch and high-surf advisory for the Island of Hawaii. More than 200 people evacuated from their homes. Huge waves crashed on the shores of the Big Island on the afternoon of July 22. The high waves washed away five beachfront homes and severely damaged dozens of others on the beach resort of Vacation Land. The total damage was around $2 million. However, only two deaths reported from the storm, both of whom drowned offshore Oahu.

Hurricane Frank 

About 24 hours later, the disturbance was upgraded into a tropical depression. Initially moving towards the west-northwest due to an upper-level low and a ridge over Mexico, the storm then turned to the west as the upper-level low changed direction. By July 28, the depression was upgraded into Tropical Storm Frank. After turning back to the west-northwest, Frank reached hurricane intensity early on July 30. The storm quickly developed a well-defined eye and three hours later, Hurricane Frank reached its peak intensity as a moderate Category 1 hurricane, with winds of 85 mph (140 km/h). Hurricane Frank maintained this intensity for 18 hours. Subsequently, the hurricane began to rapidly weaken over  sea surface temperatures. Wind shear soon increased, thus accelerating the weakening process. On July 31, Frank was reduced to tropical storm intensity. Not long after weakening into a depression, the storm entered the CPHC's area of responsibility. Wind shear increased further, and upon entering the region, Frank moved over slightly cooler water. It transitioned into an extratropical cyclone on August 3.

Tropical Storm Georgette 

Twelve hours later, it strengthened into Tropical Storm Georgette before weakening to a depression on August 4. It then accelerated to a very rapid speed of 23–45 mph (37–75 km/h). Due to its fast speed, Georgette could not maintain a closed circulation, and thus degenerated into a non-cyclonic disturbance on August 4. The disturbance kept up its rapid forward motion, crossed the dateline and entered the western Pacific, where it reformed and reached its peak intensity as Severe Tropical Storm Georgette. By August 16, Georgette merged with another system.

Tropical Storm Howard 

A tropical wave crossed Southwestern Mexico and Belize in mid-August. Several hours later, the depression reached tropical storm intensity. Turning towards the northwest due to a trough, it failed to intensify beyond minimal tropical storm strength. Passing south of the Baja California Peninsula, the storm rapidly moved over cooler waters. Howard weakened into a tropical depression at 0600 UTC August 18. Transversing  water, Howard dissipated. Further north, rainfall was more scattered.

Tropical Storm Isis 

Twenty-four hours later the disturbance was upgraded into a tropical depression on August 19. The depression intensified into Tropical Storm Isis the next day. After peaking as a moderate tropical storm at 1200 UTC August 23, Isis weakened into a depression over  waters early on August 24.

Hurricane Javier 

Satellite imagery began to show signs of developing a circulation, and the disturbance became a tropical depression on August 20 and intensified into Tropical Storm Javier hours later. Southwest of a ridge, Javier began to turn towards the west-northwest. Despite an increase in forward speed, Tropical Storm Javier underwent rapid intensification, reaching hurricane intensity at 0900 UTC August 21. About three hours later, Javier reached Category 2 strength, and briefly became a major hurricane on August 22, only to rapidly weaken back to a Category 1 hurricane late on August 23. Hurricane Javier sharply turned towards the north and eventually towards the northwest. Early on August 24, Javier resumed intensification, regaining Category 3 intensity at 0600 UTC. Passing midway between Socorro Island and Clarion Island, the storm reached its peak intensity of 130 mph (210 km/h). Moving beneath the ridge, Hurricane Javier turned to the west and subsequently weakened back into a Category 3 hurricane.

After briefly re-intensifying into a Category 4, the storm resumed weakening due to increasing wind shear, and by late on August 25, Hurricane Javier had weakened directly into a Category 2 hurricane. Shortly thereafter, Javier was downgraded into a Category 1 hurricane. While it managed to maintain marginal hurricane intensity for 24 hours. on 1200 UTC August 28, the EPHC announced that Javier had weakened back into a tropical storm. Shortly after that, Javier turned towards the west-northwest due an upper-level trough. Now over  waters, the system continued to weaken as wind shear increased further. Waves were 15 ft (4.6 m) high in some areas, prompting meteorologists to issue a high surf advisory. Hurricane Javier brought the highest waves of the summer to southern California.

Tropical Storm Kay 

Moving slowly west, the disturbance began to develop a well-defined circulation, and was respectively upgraded into a tropical depression on August 28. Passing 10 mi (20 km) south of Clarion Island, the depression strengthened into Tropical Storm Kay. The cyclone's forward speed increased; subsequently, Kay reached its peak intensity. After maintaining its intensity for 18 hours, Kay rapidly weakened over cold water, and was downgraded into a depression at 0000 UTC September 2. Kay dissipated the next day several hundred miles west of the Baja California Peninsula.

Tropical Storm Lester 

A westward-moving tropical wave increased in thunderstorm activity, soon organizing into a tropical depression on September 13. Moving towards the west, the depression soon intensified into Tropical Storm Lester. After turning towards the west-northwest, Lester peaked in intensity as a moderate tropical storm. Due to a combination of strong wind shear and cold water, Lester began a slow weakening trend. While entering the CPHC's area of responsibility at 1800 UTC September 17, Lester had already weakened to a tropical depression. Unable to maintain a closed circulation, the final advisory was issued.

Tropical Storm Madeline 

A tropical disturbance first developed during September 13 and September 14 over the warm waters south of Acapulco. On September 15, the EPHC first classified the system as a tropical depression. Rapidly moving towards the west, the depression was embedded in deep easterly flow. The system attained tropical storm intensity on 1800 UTC September 16, thus received the name Madeline. After turning towards the west-northwest, Tropical Storm Madeline accelerated. It began a slow intensification trend, and peaked as a high-end tropical storm on 0600 UTC September 18. An upper-level low introduced strong wind shear, and Madeline began to fall apart almost immediately thereafter. After turning towards the north, and slowing down, Madeline dissipated on September 22.

Hurricane Newton 

A tropical disturbance became a tropical depression on September 18. Intensification was slow as the depression did not reach storm status until September 20. Paralleling the coast, Newton steadily intensified. Newton strengthened into a hurricane on September 21. On September 22, Newton slammed into Cabo San Lucas, and after entering the Gulf of California, Hurricane Newton attained its peak intensity 85 mph (140 km/h). Shortly after that, Newton moved inland into the mainland of Mexico. Over land, Newton dissipated on September 23.

Upon making landfall on the Baja California Peninsula, moderate rainfall was recorded. After the hurricane's second landfall, damage was also minor, though 40 roofs were ripped off of homes; trees and utility poles were also downed due to high winds. However, no injuries or fatalities were reported in association with Newton. Newton's remnants later combined with a cold front to produce heavy rainfall that downed power lines in Kansas City, leaving 20,000 customers without power.

Hurricane Orlene 

Hurricane Orlene originated from a stationary tropical disturbance that was upgraded into a tropical depression on September 21. Despite a poorly defined circulation, the cyclone intensified into Tropical Storm Orlene 12 hours after formation. Steadily gaining strength, Orlene reached hurricane intensity on September 22. Shortly thereafter, the hurricane entered the CPHC's area of responsibility. Upon the formation of an eye, Orlene reached its peak intensity of 80 mph (130 km/h). After maintaining peak intensity for 24 hours, Hurricane Orlene began to encounter strong wind shear. Subsequently, Orlene weakened rapidly and lost hurricane status at 1800 UTC September 23. The system weakened into a tropical depression on September 24. Tropical Depression Orlene dissipated the next day.

Hurricane Paine 

A tropical disturbance developed on September 27 within  of the Mexican coastline. The disturbance was upgraded into Tropical Depression Twenty-Three on 0000 UTC September 28. Tropical Depression Twenty-Three moved west-northwestward, lured poleward by an upper-level trough near northern Mexico. At 0000 UTC September 30, the depression became Tropical Storm Paine, southwest of Acapulco. Roughly 21 hours later, a NOAA Hurricane Hunter flight found winds of 90 mph (145 km/h), upgrading Paine into hurricane. The hurricane peaked as a Category 2 hurricane on October 1 as it turned northwest, headed towards the Gulf of California. Hurricane Paine did not intensify further due to the presence of mid-level wind shear and dry air. The outer eyewall moved across Cabo San Lucas, and the resultant land interaction was believed to have slightly weakened the inner core of the hurricane. Paine moved ashore near San José, Sonora with winds of 100 mph (160 km/h). The storm weakened as it moved over land going through Mexico and then entering the United States. Paine dissipated on October 4 over Lake Michigan.

Rainfall from the tropical cyclone was significant in Mexico and the United States. Light rain fell in Cabo San Lucas. Meanwhile, rains around the Mexican Mainland peaked at 12 in (300 mm) in Acapulco. Near the area around where it made landfall, strong winds knocked down trees and caused disruptions to city services. The Barnsdall, Oklahoma weather station recorded 10.42 inches (26.5 cm) on September 29, which set a record for the highest daily precipitation for any station statewide. The flooding affected 52 counties in Oklahoma, which resulted in a total of $350 million in damage. In all, Paine was described as one of the worst floods in Oklahoma history. Flooding from Paine resulted in about 1,200 people homeless in East Saint Louis, Illinois and resulted in record discharge rates along many streams and creeks. Subsequently, many reservoirs were nearly filled to its capacity. For example, the Mississippi River in St. Louis reached the fifth highest flood stage on record.

Hurricane Roslyn 

A tropical disturbance moved westward offshore Nicaragua and was declared Tropical Depression Twenty-Four on October 15.. During the early afternoon of the next day, ship reports indicated the formation of a tropical depression close to land. The cyclone moved at a quick pace towards the west-northwest south of a warm-core ridge. Early on the morning on October 16, Roslyn became a tropical storm. By the morning of the October 17, Roslyn had developed into a hurricane south of Acapulco. A vigorous upper trough was deepening offshore Baja California, and Roslyn began to re-curve within a few hundred miles of Manzanillo. The system struck Mazatlán as a marginal hurricane on October 20. The low-level center rapidly dissipated, although a frontal low developed in the western Gulf of Mexico, which moved over southeastern Texas and later through the Mississippi Valley. The original upper-level circulation maintained its northeast movement, bringing rainfall to the Southeastern United States.

Roslyn produced some flooding, but no serious damage. Impact was limited to flooded homes and factories, as well as some crop damage and beach erosion and only one yacht sunk. The remnants of Hurricane Roslyn produced heavy rainfall across the central and southern United States.

Other systems 
In addition to the 17 named storms, there were eight tropical depressions during the season that failed to reach tropical storm strength. The second, Tropical Depression Seven, began as a large area of thunderstorms near Hurricane Estelle on July 17. Cool sea surface temperatures and its proximity to Hurricane Estelle eventually caused the depression to dissipate late on July 18.

It dissipated on July 24. Another tropical disturbance formed on July 24. A circulation developed two days later, and thus it was classified as Tropical Depression Ten. The cyclone remained a tropical depression for about three days before moving into the CPHC's area of responsibility on 1000 UTC July 27.

One-C passed well south of the Hawaiian Islands on July 28. On July 29 at 0000 UTC, it had dissipated to the southwest of the Hawaiian Islands and the final advisory was issued by the CPHC.

It drifted slowly to the northwest until it dissipated near 22 °N 110 °W on August 14.

One of the last cyclones of the season formed from a westward-moving tropical disturbance in the ITCZ. However the depression lasted for only six hours before dissipating, likely due to the close distance between it and Tropical Storm Madeline. Tropical Depression Twenty-Five was the final tropical depression of the 1986 season. It formed on October 22 at 1800 UTC near the 140°W line. Due to strong wind shear, the stationary storm had dissipated within 30 hours of formation. Even though no more official systems developed, a forecaster at the National Hurricane Center remarked that an unnamed tropical storm may have formed in November.

Storm names 
The following names were used for named storms that formed in the eastern Pacific in 1986. No names were retired, so it was used again in the 1992 season. This is the same list used for the 1980 season. A storm was named Paine for the first time in 1986, while Orlene and Roslyn were previously used on the old four-year lists. No central Pacific names were used; the first name used would have been Oka. Names that were not assigned are marked in gray.

See also 

 List of Pacific hurricanes
 Pacific hurricane season
 1986 Atlantic hurricane season
 1986 Pacific typhoon season
 1986 North Indian Ocean cyclone season
 South-West Indian Ocean cyclone seasons: 1985–86, 1986–87
 Australian region cyclone seasons: 1985–86, 1986–87
 South Pacific cyclone seasons: 1985–86, 1986–87

Notes

References

External links 
 Unisys Weather archive for the Eastern Pacific, 1986
 Central Pacific Hurricane Center archive

 
Pacific hurricane seasons
1986 ATL